Old Serbian may refer to:

 someone or something related to the Old Serbia, a historical region
 Old Serbian language, a general term for the pre-modern variants of Serbian language, including:
 the Serbian recension of Old Church Slavic language
 the Slavo-Serbian language, an early modern variant of Serbian language
 Old Serbian Cyrillic alphabet, a general term for the pre-modern variants of Serbian Cyrillic alphabet

See also
 Serbia (disambiguation)
 Serbian (disambiguation)
 Serbians
 Old Croatian (disambiguation)

Language and nationality disambiguation pages